Blazing Swan is an annual regional Burning Man event held near Jilakin Lake in the Shire of Kulin, Western Australia.  It is an experiment in temporary community and artistic expression, and is guided by eleven main principles, including radical inclusion, gifting and radical self-reliance.  The event occurs around Easter each year, usually over a period of seven days. The event location is on bushland adjacent to Jilakin Lake, and is referred to as Jilakin Rock City. Each year a wooden effigy is built and burned at the culmination of the event.

History
Blazing Swan was started by a collective of artists / producers who have all attended the Burning Man Festival in the US and were inspired to organize an official regional event in Western Australia.

Culture

Eleven Principles
Blazing Swan is understood not as an event, but as referring to a way of life lived consistently with these 11 Principles. They are meant to be taken as a whole, as a set of commonly-understood values.

 Radical Inclusion: Anyone may be a part of Blazing Swan. We welcome and respect the stranger. No pre-requisites exist for participation in our community.
 Gifting: Blazing Swan is devoted to acts of gift giving. The value of a gift is unconditional. Gifting does not contemplate a return or an exchange for something of equal value.
 Decommodification: In order to preserve the spirit of gifting, our community seeks to create social environments that are unmediated by commercial sponsorships, transactions, or advertising. We stand ready to protect our culture from such exploitation. We resist the substitution of consumption for participatory experience.
 Radical Self-reliance: Blazing Swan encourages the individual to discover, exercise and rely on his or her inner resources.
 Radical Self-expression: Radical self-expression arises from the unique gifts of the individual. No one other than the individual or a collaborating group can determine its content. It is offered as a gift to others. In this spirit, the giver should respect the rights and liberties of the recipient.
 Communal Effort: Our community values creative cooperation and collaboration. We strive to produce, promote, and protect social networks, public spaces, works of art, and methods of communication that support such interaction.
 Civic Responsibility: We value civil society. Community members who organize events should assume responsibility for public welfare and endeavor to communicate civic responsibilities to participants. They must also assume responsibility for conducting events in accordance with local, state and federal laws.
 Leaving No Trace: Our community respects the environment. We are committed to leaving no physical trace of our activities wherever we gather. We clean up after ourselves and endeavor, whenever possible, to leave such places in a better state than when we found them.
 Participation: Our community is committed to a radically participatory ethic. We believe that transformative change, whether in the individual or in society, can occur only through the medium of deeply personal participation. We achieve being through doing. Everyone is invited to work. Everyone is invited to play. We make the world real through actions that open the heart.
 Immediacy: Immediate experience is, in many ways, the most important touchstone of value in our culture. We seek to overcome barriers that stand between us and a recognition of our inner selves, the reality of those around us, participation in society, and contact with a natural world exceeding human powers. No idea can substitute for this experience.
 Consent: Compliance in or approval of what is done or proposed by another; specifically: the voluntary agreement or acquiescence by a person of age or with requisite mental capacity who is not under duress or coercion and usually who has knowledge or understanding.

Theme Camps
Theme camps are an integral part of Burning Man culture.  These are established by the event participants and contribute to the unique identity of Blazing Swan.

Blazing Swan, Inc.
Blazing Swan, Inc. is the not-for-profit incorporated association dedicated to organizing the annual Blazing Swan event. As per Blazing Swan Inc.'s Constitution, its main objectives are to:
(a) organize, develop and promote: 
(i) an annual arts, music, and cultural festival which is inclusive, accepting, and safe;
(ii) other related events promoting self expression, identity and understanding;
(b) foster and create new art projects in Western Australia;
(c) develop and support workshops and training activities;
(d) support and develop community based fundraising events to further the Association’s objects;
(e) train volunteers to facilitate the Association’s objects; and
(f) conduct the Association’s activities in an environmentally sustainable manner.

Community Involvement
Blazing Swan Inc. is involved with a number of Community art projects and philanthropic activities in Western Australia.  Some examples are:

 Providing significant art grants to the community to encourage creative expression.
 Donating $10 from each ticket sold at the 2015 event towards funding a full-time age care nurse to the Shire of Kulin.
 Partnership with the Australian Government's 'Work for the Dole' program, to help job seekers gain skills and experience that give back to the community and can help them find a job.
 Donating a  metal sculpture created by Matt Bray to the Shire of Kulin, as a permanent public art offering.

References

External links
 

Burning Man
Counterculture festivals